was a master shakuhachi player, teacher, and craftsman.

Like his teacher, Kyochiku Tani, Nishimura became a komusō (a mendicant shakuhachi player). Nishimura wandered Japan as a mendicant for ten years.

Kyochiku Tani was trained in the Fuke sect. After the sect's abolition in 1871, he continued the tradition of shakuhachi playing as a spiritual practice.

The early 20th century saw a revival of the shakuhachi as a secular instrument for ensembles. Amateur shakuhachi flautists formed secular orchestras. Nishimura, however, played an antiquated shakuhachi with no plaster added to the bore. He also favoured long instruments. He decided to call this flute style kyotaku in order to differentiate it from the shorter, modern shakuhachi tuned to D minor pentatonic. The name kyotaku comes from the legend of the foundation of the Fuke sect described in Kyotaku denki kokuji kai.

Nishimura's son, Koryū, continued the study and teaching of kyotaku in Kumamoto.

Nishimura attained the rank of sixth dan in Okinawa karate, and of third dan in kendo. His other artistic pursuits included woodcarving and painting.

Albums
 Fuke Shu Honkyoku; Kyorei
 Kyotaku (1998, remastered from a  tape)

See also
 Fuke-shū
 Buddhism in Japan

External links
 Nishimura Koku page at komuso.com
 Nishimura, Kyoryū. 2007. Kokū. Kumamoto: Self release. 
 Yamamoto, Morihide. 1795. Kyotaku Denki Kokuji Kai [Japanese Translation and Annotation of the History of the Kyotaku], Kyoto: Kōto Shōrin. Reprinted 1981. Tokyo: Nihon ongaku sha.

1915 births
2002 deaths
Shakuhachi players
Performers of Buddhist music
Japanese kendoka
Japanese male karateka
Japanese Zen Buddhists
20th-century Japanese musicians
20th-century flautists